Sharpsville is a borough in western Mercer County, Pennsylvania, United States, along the Shenango River. The population was 4,253 as of the 2020 census. It is part of the Youngstown–Warren metropolitan area.

History
The First Universalist Church of Sharpsville and Jonas J. Pierce House are listed on the National Register of Historic Places.

Geography
Sharpsville is located at  (41.259005, -80.481791).

Demographics

As of the census of 2022, there were 3,930 people, 1,971 households and 804 families residing in the borough. The population density was 2,825 per square mile (1,250.0/km2). There were 2,016 housing units at an average density of 1,453.4 per square mile (560.0/km2). The racial makeup of the borough was 97.53% White, 1.22% African American, 0.91% Asian, and 0.34% from two or more races. Hispanic or Latino of any race were 0.6% of the population.

There were 1,971 households, of which 40.8% were married couples living together, 14.9% had a female householder with no husband present, 4% had a male householder with no wife present, and 40.4% were non-families. The average household size was 2.11 and the average family size was 2.77.

In the borough the population was spread out, with 28.9% under the age of 20, 24.8% from 21 to 40, 29.6% from 41 to 60, and 16.9% from 60 to 80+. The median age was 44.5 years, for males it is 42.5, and females 47.2. The sex ratio is 2,269 female at 54.4%, and male at 1,899 at 45.6%.

The median income for a household in the borough was $46,523, and the median income for a family was $65,000. Males had a median income of $41,900 versus $31,439 for females. The per capita income for the borough was $29,830. About 12.6% of the population were below the poverty line, including 25% of those under age 18 and 4% of those age 65 or over.

Broadcast media

Television 
Because of Sharpsville's location near the Pennsylvania/Ohio border, it is served by WKBN-TV (CBS), WFMJ-TV (NBC), WYTV (ABC), WYFX-LD (Fox) and WBCB (CW), all broadcast from nearby Youngstown, OH.

Radio 
Sharpsville is served by AM radio stations such as WPIC (790 AM) from Sharon and WKBN (570 AM) from Youngstown and FM radio stations such as WYFM/"Y-103" (102.9 FM) from Sharon, WAKZ/"KISS FM" (95.9 FM) from Sharpsville, WYLE/"Willie 95.1" (95.1 FM) from Grove City, and WMXY/"Mix 98.9" (98.9 FM) from Youngstown.

Notable people 

 Carmen Argenziano – actor
 Marvin Pierce – president of American magazine publisher McCall Corporation, and father of United States First Lady Barbara Pierce Bush
 Brian L. Stafford – 20th Director of the United States Secret Service

See also 
 Buhl Farm Golf Course

References

External links

Borough website
Sharpsville, PA/city-dat
Buhl Farm Park 
Sharpsville Area Historical Society

Boroughs in Mercer County, Pennsylvania
Populated places established in 1874
1874 establishments in Pennsylvania